Joseph M. Souki (born 1933) is an American Democratic politician and former Speaker of the Hawaii House of Representatives.

He served as a Private First Class in the United States Army from 1954–1956.

Souki replaced former Speaker Calvin Say in 2013, after organizing a coalition with both Democrats and Republicans. This was his second tenure as Speaker, as he had previously served from 1993 to 1999. He represented Hawaii's 8th District since 1982, and served as Chair of the Finance Committee and the Transportation Committee. He was the primary sponsor of 825 bills. Before becoming a politician, Souki was a real estate broker and Executive Director of the Maui Economic Opportunity.

Souki was accused by several women of multiple counts of sexual harassment including unwanted kissing, touching and sexual language by the Hawaii State Ethics Commission. On March 21, 2018, Souki agreed to resign his seat, apologize and pay a $5,000 fine.

See also 

 Politics of Hawaii
 Me Too movement

References

1933 births
Living people
Speakers of the Hawaii House of Representatives
Democratic Party members of the Hawaii House of Representatives
Woodbury University alumni
21st-century American politicians